Live at Stubb's is a live album by the American rock band Ween, released in 2003. It was recorded during two dates at Stubb's in Austin, Texas in July, 2000. There are three discs of material, including material from all seven studio albums the band had released at that point, three songs not officially released on a previous Ween album, and a Van Halen cover song. The third disc contains only the song "L.M.L.Y.P.", in both audio and video (MPEG) format.

Track listing
All songs written by Ween, except "Hot for Teacher" by Eddie Van Halen, Alex Van Halen, David Lee Roth, and Michael Anthony.

Disc one

Disc two

Disc three

References 

2003 live albums
2003 video albums
Live video albums
Ween live albums
Ween video albums